Orlando Wiet is a Surinamese-French former world champion kickboxer, boxer and mixed martial artist.

Kickboxing
Orlando Wiet was training in Breda with Ramon Dekkers , Cor Hemmers. He also trained in Thailand for some periods. Orlando fought at K-1, It's Showtime tournaments. In 1985 Orlando defeated Stephane Nikiema and  won European muaithai championship. In 1989 he defeated Omar Benamar and won world title. Orlando defetaed Ivan Hippolyte in 1995 April. Next defeated fighter was Azem Maksutaj and after that he took part in K-1 Grand Prix tournament in 1995 July, defeating  Franz Haller at first round and loss to Taiei Kin in second round,  Ivan Hippolyte who was defeated by Oralndo in previous match won that tournament.

Mixed martial arts
In 1994 Orlando decided to take part in  UFC 2 tournament. UFC 2 was tournament with fighters of different styles. Orlando represented muay-tai. He was lightest fighter among sixteen participants of tournament with 170 pounds of weight. However, in the opening round, he could use his muay thai techniques and defeated 6.2 tall and 245 pounds Robert Lucarelli via TKO (Corner Stoppage) with elbow, knee strikes and punches. Then, in the quarterfinals, he met tallest and heaviest judo fighter of that tournament, 6.4 tall and 260 pounds Remco Pardoel. Pardoel could use his weight advantage  and Orlando was defeated via TKO and got seriously injured. After next loss to Todd Bjornethun year later Orlando decided to focus on boxing and kickboxing.

Boxing
Orlando Wiet start his boxing career in 1996. And he held boxing matches in parallel with kickboxing. After four win streak he was defeated by 	Aziz Daari. And next fights were not so successful as in kickboxing. He had matches against such opponents as Byron Mitchell, Bruno Girard.

After retiring
Wiet's career ended in 1999 when he sustained a critical groin injury throwing a high kick in training. Wiet retired from fights in 1999 after 180 fights and number of injuries. However he came back once in 2005, once in 2008 and once in 2011 to fight in MMA. All three fights he loss by submission. Wiet has subsequently worked as a coach, training fighters such as  Karim Souda .

Personal life
Orlando Wiet was married to Valérie Hénin, female boxer with 2-0-1 record in professional boxing and kickboxer with 0–2 record. Valerie helped her husband  in training for part of his matches. The couple broke up a little later. From this marriage, Orlando has a daughter, taekwondo world champion   Magda Wiet-Hénin.

Titles and achievements
 European Muaythai Champion
 5 time world Muaythai Champion
 WTC Super Middleweight World Champion 1997

Mixed martial arts record

|-
| Loss
| align=center| 1–5
| Zoran Milovic
| Submission (armbar)
| GCP - Greater Champion Podgorica
| 
| align=center| 1
| align=center| 0:43
| Podgorica, Montenegro
|-
| Loss
| align=center| 1–4
| Paul Jenkins
| Submission (americana)
| NGT 5 - Iustitia Divina
| 
| align=center| 2
| align=center| 1:50
| Milan, Italy
|-
| Loss
| align=center| 1–3
| Mario Stapel
| Submission
| S-1 - European Grand Prix 2005
| 
| align=center| 1
| align=center| 0:00
| Germany
|-
| Loss
| align=center| 1–2
| Todd Bjornethun
| Submission (triangle choke)
| UFCF - United Full Contact Federation 1
| 
| align=center| 1
| align=center| 5:43
| United States
|  
|-
| Loss
| align=center| 1–1
| Remco Pardoel
| KO (elbows)
| rowspan=2|UFC 2: No Way Out
| rowspan=2|
| align=center| 1
| align=center| 1:29
| rowspan=2|Denver, Colorado, United States
| 
|-
|  Won
| align=center| 1–0
| Robert Lucarelli
| TKO (knees)
| align=center| 1
| align=center| 2:50
| 
|}

Kickboxing and Muay Thai record (incomplete)

|-  bgcolor="#c5d2ea"
| 1999-10-24 || Draw ||align=left| Perry Ubeda  || It's Showtime - It's Showtime || Haarlem, Netherlands || Decision Draw || 5 || 3:00

|-  bgcolor="#ffbbbb"
| 1997-06-07 || Loss||align=left| Taiei Kin  || K-1: Fight Night '97 || Zurich, Switzerland || Decision || 5 || 3:00
|-
|-  bgcolor="CCFFCC"
| 1996-06-02 || Win||align=left| Toshiyuki Atokawa ||  K-1 Fight Night || Zurich, Switzerland || TKO || 2 || 0:30
|-
|-  bgcolor="#ffbbbb"
| 1995-07-16 || Loss||align=left| Taiei Kin  ||   K-1: Legend 95 ||  Nagoya, Japan || Decision · Majority|| 3 || 3:00
|-
|-  bgcolor="CCFFCC"
| 1995-07-16 || Win||align=left| Franz Haller ||   K-1: Legend 95 ||  Nagoya, Japan || Decision || 3 || 3:00
|-  bgcolor="CCFFCC"
| 1995-06-10 || Win||align=left| Azem Maksutaj ||  K-1 Fight Night || Zurich, Switzerland || KO (left punch) || 2 || 2:45
|-
|-  bgcolor="CCFFCC"
| 1995-04-02 || Win||align=left| Ivan Hippolyte ||  || Amsterdam, Netherlands || Decision || 5 || 3:00
|-
|-  bgcolor="#ffbbbb"
| 1994-12-10 || Loss ||align=left| Taro Minato ||  K-1: Legend 94 || Nagoya, Japan  || Decision || 5 || 3:00
|-
|-  bgcolor="#ffbbbb"
| 1994-09-18 || Loss ||align=left| Taiei Kin ||  K-1 Revenge || Yokohama, Japan  || KO (Right high kick)|| 4 || 0:08
|-
|-  bgcolor="#ffbbbb"
| 1992-06-21 || Loss ||align=left| Farid Kenniche ||   || Paris, France || Decision || 5 || 3:00
|-  bgcolor="#ffbbbb"
| 1992-04-09 || Loss ||align=left| Stephane Nikiema || Paris Fight Night 1992 || Paris, France || Decision || 5 || 3:00
|-  bgcolor="#ffbbbb"
| 1992|| Loss ||align=left| Changpuek Kiatsongrit ||   || Olham, England, UK || Decision(split) || 5 || 3:00
|-  bgcolor="#ffbbbb"
| 1992|| Loss ||align=left| Jomhod Kiatadisak ||   || Germany ||   ||   ||  
|-  bgcolor="#ffbbbb"
| 1991-04-21 || Loss ||align=left| Ivan Hippolyte || Kickboxing "Holland vs Canada" || Amsterdam, Netherlands || Decision || 5 || 3:00
|-  bgcolor="CCFFCC"
| 1989 || Win||align=left| Omar Benamar ||    || Amsterdam, Netherlands || Decision  ||5 || 3:00
|-  bgcolor="#ffbbbb"
| 1988-11-20 || Loss ||align=left| Ivan Hippolyte ||  || Amsterdam, Netherlands || Decision || 5 || 3:00
|-  bgcolor="#ffbbbb"
| 1987-11-17 || Loss ||align=left| Luc Verheye ||  || Amsterdam, Netherlands || Ko || 2 || 1:27
|-  bgcolor="#ffbbbb"
| 1986 || Loss ||align=left| Krongsak Sakkasem ||  ||   France || Decision|| 5 || 3:00
|-  bgcolor="CCFFCC"
| 1985-12-28|| Win||align=left| Stéphane Nikiéma  || European Muaythai Championship   || Amsterdam, Netherlands || Decision  ||5 || 3:00
|-  bgcolor="#ffbbbb"
| 1986 || Loss ||align=left| Aurelien Duarte ||  ||   France || Decision|| 5 || 3:00
|-  bgcolor="CCFFCC"
| || Win||align=left| Keith Nathan  ||   ||   || KO || 4 || 1:47
|-  bgcolor="CCFFCC"
| || Win||align=left| Bayram Colak  ||   ||   || Decision || 5 || 3:00

Professional boxing record

References

French male kickboxers
Surinamese male kickboxers
Living people
1965 births
Ultimate Fighting Championship male fighters
Martial arts trainers